Tarhani-ye Sofla (also Romanized as Ţarḩānī-ye Soflá and Ţarhānī-ye Soflá; also known as Ţarhānī-ye Pā’īn) is a village in Qaleh-ye Mozaffari Rural District, in the Central District of Selseleh County, Lorestan Province, Iran. At the 2006 census, its population was 374, in 80 families.

References 

Towns and villages in Selseleh County